Bois-Colombes is a railway station serving the town Bois-Colombes, Hauts-de-Seine department, in the northwestern suburbs of Paris, France. It sees services from Transilien Saint-Lazare and in the future, Paris Metro Line 15.

External links
 

Railway stations in Hauts-de-Seine
Railway stations in France opened in 1857
Gare de Bois-Colombes